Orest Mikhailovich Somov (Russian and , romanized Ukrainian standard: Orest Mykhailovych Somov/Somiv) ( – ) was a Russian romantic writer of Ukrainian origin.

He studied at Kharkiv University, where he became an admirer of Romantic literature and Gothic fiction.

In 1817 he moved to Saint Petersburg where he continued his literary career. In addition to being a writer and translator, he established himself as a critic, editor and publisher, thus becoming one of the first professional men of letters in the Russian Empire. Somov was drawn to the folklore of his native Ukraine and much of his writing refers to Ukrainian history and folklore.

Somov was a popular writer during his lifetime. His works on Ukrainian themes made a big impact on the literary canon of the 1820s. His literary works were widely read and his critical opinion was highly regarded. However, after Somov's death, his name and works were consigned to oblivion. Only in 1989 Yuriy Vynnychuk put Somov back on the Ukrainian literary radar collection of Somov’s folktales. 

He is distantly related to the American actor René Auberjonois; Auberjonois' maternal grandfather's mother was a Russian noblewoman, Eudoxia Michailovna Somova (1850–1924), a collateral cousin of Somov's.

Famous works 
 1825-1830 – Haidamaka
 1827 — God’s Fool
 1827 — Order from the other World
 1829 — Kikimora
 1829 — Rusalka
 1829 — The Werewolf
 1830 — Tales of Buried Treasures
 1830 — Strange Duel
 1830 — Self-murderer
 1831 — Kupalo Eve
 1832 — Wandering Light
 1833 — The Witches of Kyiv
 1833 — The Evil Eye
 1833 — Mommy and Sonny

English translations
Mommy and Sonny (story), from 
Tales of Buried Treasures, The Werewolf and The Witches of Kyiv were included in Russian 19th Century Gothic Tales: Anthology, Raduga Publishers, 1984.
The Witches of Kyiv, Rusalka, The Evil Eye, Wandering Light, Kupalo Eve and God’s Fool comprise

References

Further reading

Charles Moser, The Cambridge History of Russian Literature.  Cambridge University Press: 1992.
N. Petrunyna,  (Orest Somov and His Prose) 

1793 births
1833 deaths
People from Vovchansk
19th-century writers from the Russian Empire
Russian-language writers
Russian literary critics
Russian translators
19th-century translators
Russian male writers
National University of Kharkiv alumni